Folkestone Central railway station is on the South Eastern Main Line in England, and is the main station serving the town of Folkestone, Kent. It is  down the line from London Charing Cross. All trains that call are operated by Southeastern.

History 
The South Eastern Main Line reached Folkestone in 1843, with a station being opened at Folkestone Junction (Folkestone East) on 18 December 1843. Folkestone West was then opened in 1863, with a station named Cheriton Arch being provided between the two on 1 September 1884.  The name Radnor Park was adopted in 1886, and for a few years with just two platform faces, the station was rebuilt in 1890 to add a bay. The station was renamed Folkestone Central in 1895.

The station was rebuilt at the time of the route's electrification in 1961 with two island platforms, linked by a subway and with ramps leading up from the ticket office and concourse, which is itself above street level (an approach road and accompanying pedestrian ramp leads up from Cheriton Road). In 1999 one island platform was abandoned, along with the subway; the platform has not been demolished, although all buildings have been removed.

Services to and from Dover Priory were suspended on 24 December 2015 due to major damage to the track and sea wall near Dover harbour caused by strong winds & tidal surges.  A replacement bus service was operation between the two stations, along with a modified timetable whilst repair work was carried out. A new £44.5 million viaduct was constructed to replace the old rail embankment and sea wall.  The line reopened on 5 September 2016, as the work progressed faster than originally anticipated.

Services 
All services at Folkestone Central are operated by Southeastern using  and  EMUs.

The typical off-peak service in trains per hour is:
 1 tph to London St Pancras International
 1 tph to London Charing Cross via 

References

External links 

Transport in Folkestone and Hythe
Railway stations in Kent
DfT Category C1 stations
Former South Eastern Railway (UK) stations
Railway stations in Great Britain opened in 1884
Railway stations served by Southeastern
Folkestone